Kerron Stewart (born 16 April 1984) is a retired Jamaican sprinter who specialized in the 100 metres and 200 metres. She is the 2008 Jamaican national champion in the 100 m clocking 10.80s. She defeated World Champion Veronica Campbell-Brown in the process and now is the 2008 Summer Olympics silver medalist after she tied with Sherone Simpson in a time of 10.98s. She also earned a bronze medal in the 200 metres at the 2008 Summer Olympics with a time of 22.00s. She was born in Kingston and retired after the 2018 season.

Stewart holds one of the fastest non-winning times for the women's 100 metres.  In the 2009 World Athletics Championships from Berlin, she ran 10.75 seconds only to finish second to compatriot, Shelly-Ann Fraser who ran a 10.73 race. Stewart also anchored the Jamaican 4x100 m relay team to victory in a time of 42.06.

Junior career
She won the U18 100m at the 2000 Carifta Games.  She also represented Jamaica at the World Junior Championships that year, winning a silver medal in the 4 x 100 m relay.  In 2001, she finished second in the 200 m at the World Youth Games.  In the following year, she finished fourth in the 100 m at the World Junior Championships, and second at the U20 100 m at the 2002 Carifta Games.  After winning the U20 100 m, and coming third in the U20 200 m at the 2003 Carifta Games, she was selected for the 2003 Pan American Games, but injured herself in the athlete's village by walking through a plate glass window in the dark, forcing her out of action for three months.

Recovering, she was selected as an alternate for the Jamaican 2004 Olympic team, but did not get to race.

Auburn University
Stewart ran track and field for Auburn University under coach Henry Rolle at NCCA division I level. She was named 2007 SEC Runner of the Year and USTFCCCA National Runner of the Year after capturing the SEC and NCAA Championships in the 60m and the 200m. She was named All-American for seven times and one of the best athlete in the school's history. In 2007, she won the Honda Sports Award as the nation's best female collegiate track and field athlete.

2008 Beijing Summer Olympics
At the 2008 Summer Olympics in Beijing she competed at the 100 metres sprint. In her first round heat she placed first in front of Ezinne Okparaebo and LaVerne Jones-Ferrette in a time of 11.28 to advance to the second round. There she improved her time to 10.98 seconds to win her heat in front of Lauryn Williams and Kim Gevaert. With 11.05 seconds in her semi final she won the race and earned her spot in the Olympic final. In a remarkable race with fellow Jamaican Shelly-Ann Fraser taking the gold, Stewart and Sherone Simpson both finished in 10.98 seconds to share the silver medal and to complete the Jamaican sweep. Together with Fraser, Simpson, Sheri-Ann Brooks, Aleen Bailey and Veronica Campbell-Brown she also took part in the 4x100 metres relay. In their first round heat (without Simpson and Stewart) they placed first in front of Russia, Germany and China. Their time of 42.24 seconds was the first time overall out of sixteen participating nations. With this result they qualified for the final in which they replaced Brooks and Bailey with Simpson and Stewart. Eventually they did not finish their race due to a mistake in the baton exchange.

2009 World Championships in Athletics
Stewart came second in the 100 m at the 2009 Jamaican national championships, finishing in 10.93 s and qualifying for the 2009 World Championships.

At the 2009 IAAF Golden Gala, Stewart won a gold medal in the Women's 100m in front of Olympic Champion Shelly-Ann Fraser, with a time of 10.75s, which tied the meet record. This was the fastest time in ten years recorded by a woman in the event, and the third-fastest time ever recorded by a Jamaican, shy of Merlene Ottey's 10.74s and Shelly-Ann Fraser's 10.73 national record.

At the 2009 World Championships Kerron Stewart won a silver medal in 100m just two hundredths of a second behind Jamaican teammate Shelly-Ann Fraser equalling her personal best of 10.75 seconds and ensuring a Jamaican one-two. Stewart did not compete in the 200m due to an ankle injury, but was anchor for the Jamaican quartet that took gold in the 4x100m Relay.

2014 Commonwealth Games
Having moved back to Jamaica in 2013 to train under new coach Glenn Mills and help to coach the next generation of Jamaican sprinting talent, she competed at the 2014 Commonwealth Games, winning a bronze medal in the 100 m and a gold medal in the 4 x 100 m (with Veronica Campbell-Brown, Schillonie Calvert and Shelly-Ann Fraser-Pryce) in a games record time.

Achievements

Personal bests
100 metres – 10.75 s (2009)
200 metres – 21.99 s (2008)

References

External links

 
 
 

1984 births
Living people
Jamaican female sprinters
Olympic athletes of Jamaica
Athletes (track and field) at the 2008 Summer Olympics
Athletes (track and field) at the 2012 Summer Olympics
Olympic silver medalists for Jamaica
Olympic bronze medalists for Jamaica
Sportspeople from Kingston, Jamaica
Commonwealth Games medallists in athletics
World Athletics Championships medalists
Medalists at the 2012 Summer Olympics
Medalists at the 2008 Summer Olympics
Athletes (track and field) at the 2014 Commonwealth Games
Commonwealth Games gold medallists for Jamaica
Commonwealth Games bronze medallists for Jamaica
World Athletics Championships athletes for Jamaica
Olympic silver medalists in athletics (track and field)
Olympic bronze medalists in athletics (track and field)
Pan American Games medalists in athletics (track and field)
Pan American Games silver medalists for Jamaica
Athletes (track and field) at the 2015 Pan American Games
World Athletics Championships winners
Medalists at the 2015 Pan American Games
Olympic female sprinters
Auburn Tigers women's track and field athletes
Auburn University alumni
21st-century Jamaican women
Medallists at the 2014 Commonwealth Games